In the first edition of the tournament, Yayuk Basuki and Romana Tedjakusuma won the title by walkover, as Ai Sugiyama (one of their opponents) was injured during the singles final, which was played previously.

Seeds

Draw

Draw

References

External links
 Official results archive (ITF)

1994 WTA Tour
Commonwealth Bank Tennis Classic